Glottopedia is a wiki devoted to linguistics.

Glottopedia was created on 27 May 2007 as a merger of two earlier projects, WikiLingua at the University of Trier (created in 2005), and Linguipedia at the Max Planck Institute for Evolutionary Anthropology in Leipzig (created in 2006).
Many or most of its topics are  treated on two pages, in English and German respectively. The content is licensed under the Creative Commons Attribution-Share Alike 3.0 licence.

It is implemented with the MediaWiki wiki engine, and limits editing to registered contributors with their real names.
As of 2021, it has about 3,200 content pages by 356 registered users.

Notes

External links
 Glottopedia

German online encyclopedias
Online encyclopedias
Encyclopedias of linguistics
English-language encyclopedias
German-language encyclopedias